Tongba is a  millet-based alcoholic beverage found in the eastern mountainous region of Nepal, Bhutan and neighbouring Indian regions of Sikkim and Darjeeling. It is the traditional  drink of the Limbu people as well as people of other Kirati communities and many other ethnic group of Nepal.
 Tongba is culturally and religiously important to the Limbus; offering it is a sign of respect to a guest, and the drink is also an important element of  special occasions and festivals.

Preparation 
Tongba is actually the name of the vessel that holds the fermented millet beverage known as mandokpenaa thee. Mandokpenaa thee is prepared by cooking and fermenting whole grain millet. The cooked millet is cooled and mixed with khesung (which is a source of molds, bacteria and yeast). Then the mass is collected and placed in a woven bamboo basket lined with green leaves or plastic, covered with thick folds of cloth and allowed to remain in a warm place for 1–2, days depending upon the temperature. The sweet mass is then packed tightly into an earthenware pot or plastic jars and the opening is usually sealed off to prevent air from entering. After 7–15 days, also depending upon the temperature, the fermentation is complete and the mass is converted to mandokpenaa thee.

The time mandokpenaa thee is left to remain undisturbed in the pot after completion of fermentation leads to its maturation. While it matures, the flavours intensify yet become more mellow. Traditionally, it is stored for about six months.

Serving 
When mature, the fermented millet is put into a container, the tongba, which is then filled with  boiled water. It is then left undisturbed for about five minutes before consuming it. A fine bamboo straw with a blind end, but perforated on the side to act as a filter, is inserted into the container to suck out the warm water and alcohol from the millet grains. More hot water is added as the tongba becomes dry, and the process is repeated until the alcohol is exhausted.

See also 

Chhaang

References 

Alcohol in Nepal
Fermented drinks
Types of beer
Nepalese drinks
Indian drinks
Limbu culture
Millets